When Lost at Sea is the debut album by The Wooden Sky, released in September 2007. The album was engineered by Ryan Hadley and John Nazario.

Track listing
All songs were written by Gavin Gardiner and The Wooden Sky, except where noted.

"This Bird Has Flown"  – 3:18
"The Wooden Sky" – 4:23
"North Dakota" – 3:51
"Darker Streets Than Mine" – 2:49
"Angst For the Memories" – 3:27
"Requiem For Mary" – 5:13
"Rant in Blue" – 3:49
"When Lost at Sea" – 3:11
"Virginia" – 2:20 (A. Colvin and FGH. Colvin)
"Poor Caroline" – 3:28
"The Lonesome Death of Helen Betty Osborne" - 4:30

2007 albums
The Wooden Sky albums